Sylvia Wene (born 1930), also known as Sylvia Wene Martin, is an American former ten-pin bowler. Wene, who is Jewish, was born in Philadelphia, Pennsylvania.
	
Wene was the first female bowler to score a perfect game in sanctioned competition (on March 28, 1951), and the first to bowl three sanctioned perfect games. Wene won the BPAA Women's All-Star tournament (predecessor to the U.S. Women's Open) in 1955 and 1960, and was named Woman Bowler of the Year by the Bowling Writers Association of America in both of those years . She was a member of the All-America teams in 1955, 1959, 1960, 1961, and 1962.

She was elected to both the Women's International Bowling Congress Hall of Fame and the United States Bowling Congress Hall of Fame in 1966.  She was inducted into the International Jewish Sports Hall of Fame in 1979, and the Philadelphia Jewish Sports Hall of Fame in 1988.

References

1930 births
Living people
Sportspeople from Philadelphia
American ten-pin bowling players
Jewish American sportspeople
21st-century American Jews